Pune district is a district in state of Maharashtra in India. There are 15 talukas (talukas) in Pune district (including 2 city talukas). The 15 talukas are divided into following 5 district subdivisions.

District Subdivisions

Baramati
 Baramati taluka
 Daund taluka 
 Indapur taluka

Bhor
 Bhor taluka
 Purandar taluka  
 Velhe taluka

Pune
 Haveli taluka
 Pune City taluka
 PCMC taluka

Shirur
 Khed taluka
 Ambegaon taluka
 Junnar taluka
 Shirur taluka

Maval
 Maval taluka
 Mulshi taluka

List of talukas in Pune district by area
The Table below list 14 of the 15 talukas of Pune district (the exception being Pimpri-Chinchwad City taluka) in the Indian state of Maharashtra, along with district subdivision and location map in the district information.

See also
 Pune district
 Talukas in Ahmednagar district

References

 
 
Geography of Pune district
Maharashtra-related lists